Eugène Charles Catalan (30 May 1814 – 14 February 1894) was a French and Belgian mathematician who worked on continued fractions, descriptive geometry, number theory and combinatorics. His notable contributions included discovering a periodic minimal surface in the space ; stating the famous Catalan's conjecture, which was eventually proved in 2002; and, introducing the Catalan number to solve a combinatorial problem.

Biography 

Catalan was born in Bruges (now in Belgium, then under Dutch rule even though the Kingdom of the Netherlands had not yet been formally instituted), the only child of a French jeweller by the name of Joseph Catalan, in 1814. In 1825, he traveled to Paris and learned mathematics at École Polytechnique, where he met Joseph Liouville (1833). In December 1834 he was expelled along with most of the students in his year for political reasons; he resumed his studies in January 1835, graduated that summer, and went on to teach at Châlons-sur-Marne. Catalan came back to the École Polytechnique, and, with the help of Liouville, obtained his degree in mathematics in 1841. He went on to Charlemagne College to teach descriptive geometry. Though he was politically active and strongly left-wing, leading him to participate in the 1848 Revolution, he had an animated career and also sat in the France's Chamber of Deputies. Later, in 1849, Catalan was visited at his home by the French Police, searching for illicit teaching material; however, none was found.

The University of Liège appointed him chair of analysis in 1865. In 1879, still in Belgium, he became journal editor where he published as a foot note Paul-Jean Busschop's theory after refusing it in 1873 - letting Busschop know that it was too empirical. In 1883, he worked for the Belgian Academy of Science in the field of number theory. He died in Liège, Belgium where he had received a chair.

Work 
He worked on continued fractions, descriptive geometry, number theory and combinatorics.  He gave his name to a unique surface (periodic minimal surface in the space ) that he discovered in 1855.  Before that, he had stated the famous Catalan's conjecture, which was published in 1844 and was eventually proved in 2002, by the Romanian mathematician Preda Mihăilescu.  He introduced the Catalan numbers to solve a combinatorial problem.

Selected publications
Théorèmes et Problèmes Géométrie élémentaire, Brussels, 2nd edition 1852, 6th edition 1879
Éléments de géométrie, 1843, 2nd printing 1847
Traité élémentaire de géométrie descriptive, 2 volumes 1850, 1852, 3rd edition 1867/1868, 5th edition 1881
Nouveau manuel des aspirants au baccalauréat ès sciences, 1852 (12 editions published)
Solutions des problèmes de mathématique et de physique donnés à la Sorbonne dans les compositions du baccalauréat ès sciences, 1855/56
Manuel des candidats à l'École Polytechnique, 2 volumes, 1857–58
Notions d'astronomie, 1860 (6 editions published)
Traité élémentaire des séries, 1860
Histoire d'un concours, 1865, 2nd edition 1867
Cours d'analyse de l'université de Liège, 1870, 2nd edition 1880
Intégrales eulériennes ou elliptiques, 1892

See also 
Catalan pseudoprime
Catalan's triangle
Catalan–Dickson conjecture
Catalan–Mersenne number conjecture
Catalan beta function
Fermat–Catalan conjecture
Fuss–Catalan number

References

External links 
 
 
 Catalan

1814 births
1894 deaths
Scientists from Bruges
Academic staff of the University of Liège
19th-century Belgian mathematicians
Corresponding members of the Saint Petersburg Academy of Sciences
Combinatorialists
Number theorists
19th-century French mathematicians